The South Korean Figure Skating Championships are a figure skating national championship held annually to determine the national champions of South Korea.

Skaters compete in the disciplines of men's singles, ladies' singles, pair skating and ice dancing. The event is organized by the Korean Skating Union.

Senior medalists

Men

Ladies

Pairs

Ice dancing

Junior medalists

Men

Ladies

Pairs

Ice dancing

Advanced novice medalists
The advanced novice competition has been held separately from the South Korean Championships since the 2013–14 season.

Boys

Girls

References

External links

 
 
 
 
 Korean Skating Union

 
Figure skating national championships
Figure skating in South Korea
Annual events in South Korea
National championships in South Korea